Phyciodes pallida, the pale crescent or pallid crescentspot, is a species of butterfly in the family Nymphalidae. It is found in western North America.

The wingspan is 33–44 mm. The butterfly flies in June in Canada.

The larvae feed on Cirsium species.

Subspecies
Listed alphabetically:
P. p. barnesi Skinner, 1897
P. p. pallida

Similar species
Phyciodes mylitta – Mylitta crescent

References

External links
Pale Crescent, Butterflies and Moths of North America
Species Phyciodes pallida - Pale Crescent, BugGuide

Melitaeini
Butterflies of North America
Butterflies described in 1864
Taxa named by William Henry Edwards